WAIS (770 AM) is a radio station broadcasting a contemporary Christian music format. WAIS licensed to serve the community of Buchtel, Ohio, United States. The station is currently owned by Nelsonville TV Cable, Inc.

References

External links
 Official Website
 

Contemporary Christian radio stations in the United States
Radio stations established in 1985
1985 establishments in Ohio
AIS
AIS